Fantasia of Life Stripe is the second full album by Japanese rock band Flumpool. The album was released on January 26, 2011 in Japan under their record label A-Sketch in two editions: a limited edition premium package and a normal package. The album was certified gold by the RIAJ in January 2011.

Album information
Both editions contain fourteen tracks; however, the limited edition premium package comes with a 48-page booklet and a special CD titled Fantezie muzicală de curcubeul vieţii (Fantasia of Life Stripe~Bloody Remix~). This CD is a remixed version of the album by a project called Red Dracul Scar Tissue.

The title of the album is derived from the theme of the album. The word "Fantasia" represents the songs in the album which are created freely without deciding on the rules and styles of creating them. The words "Life Stripe" represent an artwork of the actions done in daily lives which are replaced with 21 colors.

Songs
Fantasia of Life Stripe contains three of the band's previously released singles: "Zanzō", "reboot~Akiramenai Uta/Nagareboshi" and "Kimi ni Todoke". 
"Zanzō" was used as the theme song for the second season of the drama Bloody Monday. "reboot~Akiramenai Uta~" was used as a support song of Japanese television network NTV's coverage of the FIFA World Cup. "Kimi ni Todoke" was used as the theme song for the movie with the same title. The song "Snowy Nights Serenade~Kokoro Made mo Tsunagitai~" included in the album is the original version of the song "Snowy Nights Serenade~Kokoro Made mo Tsunagitai~ Xmas ver." which was released in December 2010 as a single limited to the members of the band's mobile fan club.

"two of us", the second track, is being used as the theme song for the show "Ainori 2".

"Snowy Nights Serenade~Kokoro Made mo Tsunagitai~", the fourth track, was used as the ending theme song for December for the show "Onegai!Ranking".

Track listing
All lyrics written by vocalist, Ryuta Yamamura.

Charts and sales

References

External links

2010 albums
Flumpool albums
A-Sketch albums